Groovy People may refer to:

 "Groovy People", a song by Lou Rawls from the album All Things in Time (1976)
 Groovy People, an EP by Marc E. Bassy (2016)